Ashley Rice (born Ashley Taylor-Rhys; 14 January 1986) is an English actor, known for his role as Sid Vere on the BBC soap opera Doctors. For his role as Sid, Rice has been nominated for various accolades including Newcomer at the 21st National Television Awards and the British Soap Award for Best Actor in 2017, 2018 and 2019. Prior to appearing in Doctors, Rice appeared in series including The Gemma Factor and portrayed the role of Seth Foreman in Tracy Beaker Returns.

Career
Rice made his professional acting debut in 2009, when he appeared in the drama film An Education. He then made brief appearances in British television series including Hope Springs, Emmerdale and Hustle. Then in 2009, he made his stage debut as Curio in a production of Twelfth Night, He has since made appearances in productions of War Horse at the Royal National Theatre, Yellow Moon and Amid The Clouds. From 2011 to 2012, Rice appeared in six episodes of the CBBC sitcom Tracy Beaker Returns as Seth Foreman.

In April 2015, Rice began portraying the role of Sid Vere in the BBC daytime soap opera Doctors. When asked for his opinion on his character, Rice stated: "He's so annoying, isn't he? I annoy myself playing him sometimes. And despite being quite bright he can completely miss the point sometimes. But he does have a good heart and only wants to do his best. I had a help from the directors in finding and using Sid's nervous energy, one in particular springs to mind." For his portrayal of Sid, Rice was longlisted for Best Actor at the British Soap Awards in 2017, 2018 and 2019.

Filmography

Awards and nominations

References

External links
 

1986 births
21st-century English male actors
Black British male actors
English male film actors
English male stage actors
English male soap opera actors
Living people
Male actors from Birmingham, West Midlands